Robert L. Tiemann is an American baseball historian based in St. Louis, and a member of SABR (the Society of American Baseball Research).  He is considered a 19th-century baseball expert.

Tiemann has written or edited several baseball books, including Nineteenth Century Stars, Baseball's First Stars, Cardinal Classics: Outstanding Games from Each of the St. Louis Baseball Clubs 100 Seasons and The National Pastime: A Review of Baseball History (Volume 10).  In 1992, he received SABR's Bob Davids Award, the organization's highest honor.

Selected works 
Baseball's First Stars, Frederick Ivor-Campbell, Robert L. Tiemann, Mark Rucker, Society for American Baseball Research, 1996, 
10 Rings: Stories of the St. Louis Cardinals World Championships, James Rygelski, Robert L. Tiemann, Reedy Pr, 2011, 
 Dodger classics: outstanding games from each of the Dodgers' 101 seasons, 1883–1983, Robert L. Tiemann, Baseball Histories, 1983, 
Mound City memories: baseball in St. Louis, Robert L. Tiemann, SABR, 2007, 
Cardinal classics: outstanding games from each of the St. Louis Baseball Club's 100 seasons, 1882–1981, Robert L. Tiemann, Baseball Histories, 1982,

References

External links
 

Year of birth missing (living people)
Living people
American sportswriters
Baseball writers
Place of birth missing (living people)